During the 1975–76 English football season, Brentford competed in the Football League Fourth Division. A poor middle third of the season led to an 18th-place finish, just three points above the re-election zone.

Season summary 

Despite a strong finish to the previous campaign, only one incoming transfer (veteran goalkeeper Bill Glazier for £4,000) did not raise the belief around Griffin Park that Brentford would challenge for promotion from the Fourth Division during the 1975–76 season. Instead, manager John Docherty made up the numbers with members of the club's youth team, with teenagers Gordon Sweetzer, Danis Salman, Paul Walker and Graham Cox all joining the club.

Brentford had a strong start to the season, winning three and drawing three of the first six league matches of the season and advancing to the second round of the League Cup, where the run was brought to an end at Old Trafford by Manchester United. With goalkeeper Bill Glazier quitting the club after just 12 appearances, Brentford would tread water in the lower reaches of mid-table throughout the season, in which a run to the third round of the FA Cup became the focus. Having reached that stage of the competition for the first time since the 1970–71 season, the Bees took Second Division club Bolton Wanderers to a replay before losing 2–0 at Burnden Park. A slight upturn in form towards the end of the season was inspired by the signing of Oxford United forward Andrew McCulloch for a club record £25,000 fee.

Two club records were set during the season:
 Youngest Football League debutant: Danis Salman, 15 years, 8 months, 3 days (versus Watford, 15 November 1975)
 Lowest away Football League attendance: 894 versus Rochdale, 27 March 1976

League table

Results
Brentford's goal tally listed first.

Legend

Pre-season and friendlies

Football League Fourth Division

FA Cup

Football League Cup 

 Sources: 100 Years of Brentford, The Big Brentford Book of the Seventies,Croxford, Lane & Waterman, p. 308. Statto

Playing squad 
Players' ages are as of the opening day of the 1975–76 season.

 Sources: The Big Brentford Book of the Seventies, Timeless Bees

Coaching staff

Statistics

Appearances and goals
Substitute appearances in brackets.

Players listed in italics left the club mid-season.
Source: 100 Years of Brentford

Goalscorers 

Players listed in italics left the club mid-season.
Source: 100 Years of Brentford

Management

Summary

Transfers & loans

Awards 
 Supporters' Player of the Year: Michael Allen
 Players' Player of the Year: Michael Allen

References 

Brentford F.C. seasons
Brentford